Svenska Cupen 1995-96 was the forty-first season of the main Swedish football Cup. The competition was concluded on 23 May 1996 with the Final held in Gamla Ullevi, Göteborg. AIK won 1-0 (golden goal) against Malmö FF before an attendance of 2,745 spectators.  A different format was used for the competition with the number of teams entered reduced by almost half compared with the previous year and the third round was run on a group basis.

First round

For results see SFS-Bolletinen - Matcher i Svenska Cupen.

Second round

For results see SFS-Bolletinen - Matcher i Svenska Cupen.

Third round

This round was run on a group basis

For results and tables see SFS-Bolletinen - Matcher i Svenska Cupen.

Group C

Fourth round

The 8 matches in this round were played between 31 March and 3 April 1996.

Quarter-finals
The 4 matches in this round were played between 8 April and 11 April 1996.

Semi-finals
The semi-finals were played on 17 April 1996.

Final
The final was played on 23 May 1996 in Gamla Ullevi, Göteborg.

Footnotes

References 

Svenska Cupen seasons
Cupen
Cupen
Sweden